Gopaldas Shankarlal Agrawal was a member of the 13th Maharashtra Legislative Assembly. He represents the Gondiya Constituency. He joined Bharatiya Janata Party ahead of 2019 Maharashtra Legislative Assembly election. It is his third term as an MLA. A RTI question revealed that Agrawal was amongst those who didn't ask a single question during the winter session of assembly held in Nagpur from 9 to 20 December 2013. A PIL filed by him against his own government revealed the government being unable to meet deadline of 19 February 2014, with regards to measures necessary in connection to starting a medical college in Gondia. This allegedly caused the MCI to reject the proposal. He was also the Chairman of Public Accounts Committee Maharashtra Legislature (PAC).

References

Maharashtra MLAs 2014–2019
Living people
Indian National Congress politicians from Maharashtra
Bharatiya Janata Party politicians from Maharashtra
People from Gondia
1951 births